The 2006–07 Harvard Crimson women's ice hockey team represented Harvard University.  The Crimson had 23 wins, compared to 8 losses and 2 ties. In the ECAC, the Crimson were 17-4-1. Nationally, the Crimson were ranked sixth. Harvard qualified for the NCAA tournament but lost in the opening round. Julie Chu was honoured with the Patty Kazmaier Award.

Player stats
Note: GP= Games played; G= Goals; A= Assists; PTS = Points; GW = Game Winning Goals; PPL = Power Play Goals; SHG = Short Handed Goals

Postseason
In the opening round, the Crimson were bested by the eventual national champion Wisconsin Badgers. The Crimson valiantly played in a four-overtime match.

Awards and honors
 Caitlin Cahow, 2006-07 ECAC Coaches Preseason All-League Selection
 Juile Chu, 2006-07 ECAC Coaches Preseason All-League Selection
 Juile Chu, 2006-07 ECAC Media Preseason All-League Selection
 Julie Chu, Patty Kazmaier Award

References

External links
Official Site

Harvard Crimson women's ice hockey seasons
Harvard
Har
Harvard Crimson women's ice hockey
Harvard Crimson women's ice hockey
Harvard Crimson women's ice hockey
Harvard Crimson women's ice hockey